Joe 4 was an American nickname for the first Soviet test of a thermonuclear weapon on August 12, 1953, that detonated with a force equivalent to 400 kilotons of TNT. The proper Soviet terminology for the warhead was RDS-6s, .

RDS-6 utilized a scheme in which fission and fusion fuel (lithium-6 deuteride) were "layered", a design known as the Sloika (named after a type of layered puff pastry) model in the Soviet Union. A ten-fold increase in explosive power was achieved by a combination of fusion and fission. A similar design was earlier theorized by Edward Teller, but never tested in the U.S., as the "Alarm Clock".

Description 
The Soviet Union started studies of advanced nuclear bombs and a hydrogen bomb, code named RDS-6, in June 1948. The studies would be done by KB-11 (usually referred to as Arzamas-16, the name of the town) and FIAN.
The first hydrogen bomb design was the Truba (pipe/cylinder) (RDS-6t)). In March 1948 Klaus Fuchs had provided the USSR with documents of the US 'Classical Super'. In these documents the classical super was described as consisting of a gun-type Uranium-235 primary with beryllium oxide tamper and a secondary consisting of a long cylinder with deuterium, doped with tritium near the primary. The design of the RDS-6t was similar to this classical super. The difference was that the light shell of beryllium oxide was replaced by a heavy shell. The assumption was that the deuterium tritium mixture could be easily heated and compressed and the shock would start the thermonuclear reaction prematurely. A heavy shell opaque to radiation would prevent this unwanted preheating more than the light shell.

In September / October 1948 Andrei Sakharov, working in FIAN, came up with a competing idea of alternating layers of deuterium and Uranium-238 around a fissile core (Sakharov's 'first idea'). This second design was code named Sloika (RDS-6s) or 'Layer Cake' after the layering. In March 1949 Vitaly Ginzburg proposed to replace the deuterium by Lithium-6 deuteride ('second idea'). The proposal was based on the better efficiency due to the generation of tritium by the neutron capture of lithium and the Uranium-238 fission by the 14 MeV neutrons from D + T fusion. At that time Ginzburg did not know that the cross section for D + T reaction was much larger than that for D + D reaction. In April 1949 the group received D + T cross section data obtained from intelligence gathering without mentioning the source. The large advantage of lithium deuteride became evident and the deuterium design was abandoned. Both the 'first' and 'second' idea were used in the RDS-6s. The result was similar to the US 'Alarm Clock', but there is no indication that the Soviets were aware of the concept of the 'Alarm Clock'.
After the United States tested Mike in November 1952, Lavrentiy Beria sent a memo to spare no effort on the development of the RDS-6s. In the final development report from June 1953 the yield  was estimated at 300 +/- 100 kilotons.

The RDS-6s was tested on August 12, 1953 (Joe 4). The measured yield was 400 kilotons, 10% from fission of the Uranium-235 core, 15-20% from fusion and 70 - 75% from fission of the Uranium-238 layers.

After the successful test Sakharov proposed a more powerful version of the RDS-6s, code named RDS-6sD. Attempts to increase the yield of the RDS-6s however proved unfeasible.
In December 1953 all research on the RDS-6t was also stopped after it was proven that thermonuclear ignition was not possible in the RDS-6t. Both the RDS-6s and the RDS-6t were dead ends and research focused again on a two-stage thermonuclear weapon.

A variant of the RDS-6s was developed later, code named RDS-27. The difference between the RDS-6s and the RDS-27 was that the RDS-27 did not use tritium. This improved the operational usefulness of the RDS-27, but reduced the yield from 400 kilotons to 250 kilotons. The RDS-27 was intended as a warhead for the R-7 ICBM. The RDS-27 was tested November 6, 1955 (Joe 18).

Despite the inability of the RDS-6s to be scaled into the megaton range, the detonation was still used by Soviet diplomats as leverage. The Soviets claimed that they too had a hydrogen bomb, but unlike the United States' first thermonuclear weapon, theirs was deployable by air. The United States didn't develop a deployable version of the hydrogen bomb until 1954.

The first Soviet test of a "true" hydrogen bomb was on November 22, 1955 under the directive of Nikolai Bulganin (influenced by Nikita Khrushchev), code-named RDS-37. All were at Semipalatinsk Test Site, Kazakh SSR. Like RDS-6, it was a "dry" weapon, using lithium-6 deuteride instead of liquid deuterium.

See also 
2013 Chelyabinsk meteor airburst, whose estimated explosive force slightly exceeded the RDS-6s test's energy
Joe 1
RDS-37
Soviet atomic bomb project
Ivy Mike
Castle Bravo
Boosted fission weapon

References 
Notes

Bibliography

External links 
Soviet and Nuclear Weapons History
Soviet/Russian Nuclear Arsenal
 Video footage of the Joe-4 Nuclear Test
 Nikolai Bulganin

Nuclear bombs of the Soviet Union
Soviet nuclear weapons testing
Cold War history of the Soviet Union
1953 in the Soviet Union
1953 in military history
Explosions in 1953
August 1953 events in Asia